If or IF may refer to:

If (conjunction), a conjunction used in English conditional sentences

Arts and entertainment

Film and television
 If.... (1968), a Lindsay Anderson film starring Malcolm McDowell
 If (2024 film), an upcoming John Krasinski film starring Ryan Reynolds
 If... (TV series), a series of BBC drama-documentaries
 "If..." (Desperate Housewives), a 2010 episode of Desperate Housewives

Gaming
 IF, a character in the Hyperdimension Neptunia game series
 Interactive fiction, text-based computer games featuring interactive stories and environments
 Shin Megami Tensei If..., a 1994 video game in the Shin Megami Tensei series
 Kill la Kill the Game: IF, a 2019 video game based on the Kill la Kill anime

Literature
 If (magazine), subtitled "Worlds of Science Fiction"
 IF Magazine, Inside Film, Australian magazine
 If... (comic), a political comic strip which appears in the UK newspaper The Guardian
 "If—" (published 1910), a poem by Rudyard Kipling

Music
 If (band), 1970s British progressive jazz-rock band
 In Flames, a melodic death metal band from Sweden, and a song from their album Lunar Strain
 I-F, stage name of Ferenc E. van der Sluijs, a Dutch producer and DJ

Albums
 If (Glass Hammer album), 2010 album by American band Glass Hammer
 If (If album), 1970 album by the English band If
 if (Mindless Self Indulgence album), a 2008 album recorded by Mindless Self Indulgence
 (if), a 2009 album by Diary of Dreams
 If..., a 2011 orchestral concept album by Bill Ryder-Jones

Songs
 "If..." (The Bluetones song), 1998
 "If" (Bread song), 1971, covered by many artists, including a UK #1 by Telly Savalas in 1975
 "If" (French Kiss song), 2011
 "If" (Glasvegas song), 2013
 "If" (Janet Jackson song), 1993
 "If" (Kana Nishino song), 2010
 "If" (Pink Floyd song), 1970
 "If (Mata Aetara)", by Day6, 2018
 "If (They Made Me a King)", written by Tolchard Evans, Robert Hargreaves and Stanley J. Damerell, 1934; notably recorded by Perry Como, 1950
 "If", by Jeri Lynne Fraser (as Jeri Lynn), 1959
 "If", by Femme Fatale from Femme Fatale, 1988
 "If", by The Cult from Ceremony, 1991
 "If", by Joe Satriani from his 1995 self-titled album
 "If...", by The Divine Comedy from A Short Album About Love, 1997
 "If", by Bananarama from Exotica, 2001
 "If", by Destiny's Child from Destiny Fulfilled, 2004
 "If", by Red Hot Chili Peppers from Stadium Arcadium, 2006
 "If", by Freemasons from Unmixed, 2007
 "If", by Joni Mitchell from Shine, 2007
 "If", by Davido, 2017
 "If", by R5 from New Addictions, 2017

Business and organizations
 If (insurance company), in the Nordic countries
 IF Metall, a trade union in Sweden
 Illuminati Films, an Indian motion picture production, based in Mumbai
 Independent Fabrication, a bicycle manufacturer
 Intelligent Finance, a bank
 Interflug (1958–1991; IATA airline designator IF)
 International Federation, any of several world sport governing bodies
 International Forum Design (iF), a society best known for its iF design awards
 Islamic Front (Syria), Sunni Islamist rebel group involved in the Syrian Civil War
 Islas Airways (founded 2002; IATA airline designator IF)

Science and technology

Biology and medicine
 If current, a component current in the cardiac pacemaker potential
 Immunofluorescence, a form of labeling substances with fluorescent antibodies
 Initiation factor, an important component in protein synthesis
 Intermediate filament, a component of the cytoskeleton
 Interstitial fluid, the liquid outside of a cell
 Intrinsic factor, produced by the stomach

Computing and mathematics
 If-then-else, a conditional statement in computer programming
 IF (x86 flag), the Interrupt Flag in the x86 processor architecture
 Information filter, or inverse covariance filter, in Kalman filtering
 Interface (computing), a shared boundary across which components of a computer system exchange information
 Intermediate form, a type of data structure in computer programming

Other uses in science and technology
 Information filtering system, which removes redundant or unwanted information at a semantic level
 Intelligent falling, a satirical "alternative theory" of gravitation
 Intermediate frequency, in radio transmission or reception
 Internal focusing, a lens technology in which focusing occurs only with internal elements
 Iodine monofluoride, an unstable interhalogen inorganic compound

Other uses
 If, a small island in the Bay of Marseille, France; location of the Château d'If
 If, a prominent example of a laconic phrase
 Impact factor, a measure reflecting the average number of citations to articles published in scholarly journals
 Intellectual freedom, a right to access, explore, consider, and express ideas and information
 Intermittent fasting, a diet having recurring periods of fasting
 Internally Flawless, a grade of diamond clarity
 Inside forward, a position in association football
 Ilfov County (except Bucharest), on the vehicle registration plates of Romania

See also
 If and only if, iff, logical statement indicating necessary and sufficient conditions
 IFF (disambiguation)
 IFS (disambiguation)